U.S. Smokeless Tobacco Company (formerly United States Tobacco Company) manufactures smokeless tobacco products, notably dipping tobacco, but also chewing tobacco, snus, and dry snuff and is a subsidiary of Altria.

Its corporate headquarters are located in Richmond, Virginia, and it maintains factories in Clarksville and Nashville, Tennessee, Franklin Park, Illinois, and Hopkinsville, Kentucky.

Copenhagen and Skoal are the company's leading brands, and each represents more than $1 billion per year in retail sales. It also sells similar products, for a lower price, under the brand names Red Seal and Husky.  It also produced Rooster until 2009, when Philip Morris decided to discontinue it.  The company also produces several varieties of dry snuff.

Skoal was one of the first moist tobacco manufacturers to offer dipping tobacco in pouches. Skoal Bandits, released in 1983, were marketed in the UK in the 1980s, but the carcinogenic tobacco pouches were banned amid public protest. This product has a small amount of tobacco in a pouch with a thin outer membrane and resembles a tiny tea bag. Skoal Bandits were invented by UST's marketing division, the manufacturing process was conceived by Gene Paules of UST, and the process was automated by David Westerman of the Automation Center, Inc., Nashville, Tennessee. Since then, Skoal has kept the Skoal Bandits products, but has also released regular-sized pouches, as well as snus, and offers pouches under the Copenhagen brand, as well.

Parent company UST was purchased by Altria Group, which now includes Philip Morris USA, John Middleton Company and US Smokeless Tobacco.

Company history
1822–1870 – Mason Tour
1870–1905 – Weyman & Bros
1905–1911 – American Tobacco Company
1911–1922 – Weyman-Bruton Company
1922–2001 – United States Tobacco Company
2001–present – U.S. Smokeless Tobacco Company

During the 19th century, chewing tobacco was distributed throughout the United States by George Weyman. Weyman was the inventor of Copenhagen Snuff, and after his death, Weyman & Bros was acquired by the American Tobacco Company. It is today known as the U.S. Smokeless Tobacco Company.

George Weyman was the father of two sons, William and Buckworth. After their father regained control of the tobacco company in the 1860s, he gave it to his two sons, when it was named Weyman & Sons Tobacco. Following their father's death, the brothers officially adopted the name Weyman & Bros Tobacco in the 1870s.

Brands

Moist snuff
 Copenhagen
 Husky
 Red Seal
 Skoal (also produces two varieties of snus)
Former brands include Happy Days and Rooster

Chewing tobacco
 WB Extra Long Cut

Dry snuff
 Bruton
 Carhart's
 DeVoe
 Red Seal (not to be confused with Red Seal moist snuff)
 Rooster (not to be confused with the former Rooster moist snuff)
 Standard
 Weyman's Best

References

External links 
 Altria: U.S. Smokeless Tobacco Company Official Website
 Cancer.gov: Smokeless Tobacco and Cancer

Tobacco companies of the United States
Chewing tobacco brands
Companies based in Fairfield County, Connecticut
IARC Group 1 carcinogens